TouchMail is an email client for Microsoft Windows, launched on April 17, 2013 at the DEMO Mobile Conference in San Francisco.

TouchMail was developed by a Seattle-based startup founded in 2012 by former Microsoft employees Matthew Carlson and Alex Frank as an e-mail client designed for touch input. It runs on both Windows 8.1 and Windows 10. The emails in the client can be color-coded with zoom out features to view more messages. The application integrates work and social messaging using visual and touch capabilities of computing devices.

References

Universal Windows Platform apps
Windows email clients